Queens of the Circulating Library is a 2000 album by the British experimental group Coil. It is unusual in the sense that it is perhaps the only release without participation from Peter Christopherson. On this album, Coil were: "Thighpaulsandra & John Balance with Dorothy Lewis as the queen of the circulating library. Thanks to Simon Norris." The lyrics were written by John Balance and spoken by Dorothy Lewis, Thighpaulsandra's mother. The line "It's in the trees, it's coming" that appears in the lyrics is from the 1957 British horror film Night of the Demon, and had previously appeared in sampled form in the song "Hounds of Love" by Kate Bush.

The album was initially released on the date of the Coil Presents Time Machines concert. The original packaging was clear, however a wider issue of the album used pink, c-shell CD cases. No album art was included for this release.

In 2022, Dais Records remastered and reissued the album on vinyl record (in six different colorways, with some having lenticular covers), CD and Bandcamp download. The remaster was done by Josh Bonati, while official cover art was created by Nathaniel Young.

Track listing

References

External links
 
 
 Queens of the Circulating Library at Brainwashed

2000 albums
Coil (band) albums